Ivirgarzama is a small town in Bolivia.

See also 
 Inkallaqta
 Carrasco National Park

External links 
 Map of the Carrasco Province

References

  Instituto Nacional de Estadistica de Bolivia  (INE)

Populated places in Cochabamba Department